Angelica hendersonii is a species of angelica known as Henderson's angelica. It is native to the west coast of the United States from Washington to central California, where it grows in the coastal sage scrub and other habitat on the immediate coastline. This is a taprooted perennial herb producing a branching erect stem to heights between about 1 and 2 meters. The basal leaves are made up of oval-shaped leaflets each up to 10 centimeters long, with toothed edges and white woolly undersides. The woolly inflorescences are compound umbels of up to 60 rays holding clusters of fuzzy flowers. The flowers yield fruits which are paired bodies nearly a centimeter long each containing a seed.

External links
Jepson Manual Treatment
USDA Plants Profile
Photo gallery

Flora of California
Flora of Oregon
Flora of Washington (state)
hendersonii
Plants described in 1888
Flora without expected TNC conservation status